Rădoi is a Romanian language surname. People with the name include:

Andrei Rădoi (born 1987), Romanian rugby union player
Mirel Rădoi (born 1981), Romanian footballer
Sorin Rădoi (born 1985), Romanian footballer
Sorin Rădoi (footballer, born 1990) (born 1990), Romanian footballer
Robert Rădoi (born 2007), Romanian footballer

Romanian-language surnames